The Consolidated Commodore was an American flying boat built by Consolidated Aircraft and used for passenger travel in the 1930s, mostly in the Caribbean, operated by companies like Pan American Airways.

History 

A pioneer of the long-haul passenger aircraft industry, the Commodore "Clipper" grew out of a Navy design competition in the 1920s to create an aircraft capable of nonstop flights between the mainland of the United States and Panama, Alaska, and the Hawaiian Islands. In response to these requirements, Consolidated produced the prototype XPY-1 Admiral, designed by Isaac M. Laddon, in January 1929. Consolidated lost out on the contract to produce the airplanes for the navy to the Glenn L. Martin Company. Martin produced one prototype XP2M and nine production P3Ms. The aircraft represented a marked change from earlier patrol boat designs such as the Curtiss NC.

In response to losing the Navy contract, Consolidated offered a passenger-carrying version of the XPY-1, which became known as the Commodore. A parasol wing monoplane with all-metal hull, it could accommodate 32 passengers and a crew of three. The full complement of passengers, located in three cabins, could be carried only on relatively short route segments. For a 1000-mile flight, the boat probably could accommodate no more than 14 people including the crew. Wing and tail construction consisted of a metal frame structure covered with fabric, except for metal-covered leading edges. The Commodore had significant changes from the XPY-1. These included more powerful engines, fuselage shape and structural improvements.

Operational service 

With a first flight in 1929, a total of 14 Commodore boats were built. Starting February 18, 1930 Commodores were flown by the New York, Rio, Buenos Aires Line from the United States to South America where routes extended as far south as Buenos Aires, a distance of 9000 miles from Miami. One testimony to the Commodore in Pan Am service was made by a Pan Am pilot, Marius Lodeesen who wrote " . . . the good old Consolidated Commodore was the most reliable, trusty air craft of the Pan American fleet during the early 1930s. . . . She was hoisted aloft by two engines. They must have been Pratt and Whitneys because they never gave any trouble. . . Waterlooping the Commodore was impossible. Making a bad landing in her was hard work. She was the loveliest boat I ever flew." As the 1930s progressed the Commodores were gradually superseded by more efficient aircraft such as the Sikorsky S-42, Martin 130, and Boeing 314. A number of them went on to serve with other operators. The Commodore may be considered a first step in the United States along a road that was to lead to the highly efficient monoplane-type patrol and transport flying boats later in the 1930s. The XPY-1 and its civil counterpart, the Commodore, may be considered progenitors in a series of flying boat developments that led to the famous Consolidated PBY Catalina of World War II fame.

Survivors 
The only known Model 16 Commodore remaining has been located in a northern Canadian lake. There is currently an ongoing project to raise and restore this airframe for display at the San Diego Air & Space Museum.

Variants
Model 16
Up to 18 passengers and three crew.
Model 16-1
Up to 22 passengers and three crew.
Model 16-2
Up to 30 passengers and three crew.

Operators 

 NYRBA-Argentina (Trimotor Safety Airways, Inc.)
 SANA (Sociedad Argentina de Navegación Aérea)

 Bahamas Airways

 NYRBA do Brasil
 Panair do Brasil
 Brazilian Air Force (Força Aérea Brasileira)

 China National Aviation Corporation (CNAC)

 New York, Rio, and Buenos Aires Line (NYRBA)
 Pan American Airways
 Alaska Star Airlines

Accidents and incidents
 On April 16, 1935, a Pan Am Commodore, registration NC660M, burned out in a hangar fire at Miami.
 On December 14, 1940, a Sociedad Argentina de Navegación Aérea (SANA) Commodore, registration LV-RAB, crashed at Puerto Nuevo, Buenos Aires.
 On June 10, 1941, Brazilian Air Force C-12 Commodore Belem crashed at Belém, Brazil, while on an unauthorized joy ride. All 8 occupants were killed.
 On June 18, 1942, an Alaska Star Airlines Commodore, registration NC664M, burned on Takla Lake, British Columbia following a fuel spill.
 On September 24, 1943, a Pan Am Commodore, registration NC668M, crashed at Miami while on a test flight, killing one of three crew on board.
 On December 24, 1948, an Aviacion del Litoral Fluvial Argentino (ALFA) Commodore, registration LV-AAL, burned out in a hangar fire at Puerto Nuevo, Argentina.

Specifications (Commodore 16-1)

See also

References

Sources
 
 
 
 
 
 Simpich, Frederick, National Geographic – January 1931, Vol. 59, No. 1, SKYPATHS THROUGH LATIN AMERICA: Flying From Our Nation's Capital Southward Over Jungles, Remote Islands, and Great Cities on an Aerial Survey of the East Coast of South America, with 78 Illustrations

External links

 Pan American's Commodore Clippers

1920s United States patrol aircraft
Commodore
Flying boats
1930s United States airliners
Parasol-wing aircraft
Aircraft first flown in 1928
Twin piston-engined tractor aircraft